Just William is a 1940 British comedy film directed by Graham Cutts and starring Richard Lupino, Fred Emney and Basil Radford. It is based on the Just William series of books by Richmal Crompton.

Plot

A rascally child recruits his friends as assistants to help his father get elected to the city council. Sadly, the children accidentally help two jewel thieves to escape. They feel sorry about this, and to redeem themselves, the kids begin investigating a rival candidate's conspiracy. Their involvement causes the boy's father to win the election.

Cast
 Richard Lupino as William Brown
 Fred Emney as Mr Brown
 Basil Radford as Mr Sidway
 Amy Veness as Mrs Bott
 Iris Hoey as Mrs Brown
 Roddy McDowall as Ginger
 Norman Robinson as Douglas
 Peter Miles as Henry
 David Tree as Marmaduke Bott
 Jenny Laird as Ethel Brown
 Simon Lack as Robert Brown

References

External links
 
 BFI Database

1940 films
Films shot at Welwyn Studios
1940s children's comedy films
British comedy films
Films directed by Graham Cutts
Films based on children's books
Just William
British black-and-white films
1940 comedy films
1940s English-language films
1940s British films